

Connecticut

Fairfield County
Carting Island, Stratford
Goose Island, Stratford
Long Island, Stratford
Norwalk Islands, Norwalk
Peacock Island, Stratford
Pope's Flat, Stratford

Middlesex County
Cedar Island, Clinton
Duck Island, Westbrook
Menunketesuck Island, Westbrook
Salt Island, Westbrook

New Haven County
Charles Island, Milford
Duck Island, Milford
Fowler Island, Milford
Nells Island, Milford
Thimble Islands, Branford

New London County
Ram Island, Stonington
North Brother Island, East Lyme
South Brother Island, East Lyme

Maine

Massachusetts

New Hampshire

New Jersey
Absecon Island
Artificial Island
Brigantine Island
Burlington Island
Cape Island
Cedar Bonnet Islands
Chadwick Beach Island
Dildine Island
Ellis Island
Long Beach Island
Ludlam Island
Newbold Island
Ocean City
Pelican Island
Petty Island
Pullen Island
Raccoon Island
Robbins Reef Light
Seven Mile Island
Shooters Island
Tocks Island
The Wildwoods

New York

Alger Island
Barnum Island
Broad Channel Island
Brother Island (Niagara River)
Carleton Island
City Island
Coney Island (formerly an actual island)
Ellis Island
Fire Island
Fishers Island
Gardiners Island
Goat Island
Governors Island
Grand Island
Hart Island
High Island
Hoffman Island
Isle of Meadows
Jones Beach Island
Liberty Island
Long Beach Island
Long Island
Manhattan Island
Mill Rock
North Brother Island
North Dumpling Island
Plum Island
Pollepel Island
Prall's Island
Randall's Island
Rat Island
Rikers Island
Roosevelt Island
Shelter Island
Shooters Island
South Brother Island
Staten Island
Swinburne Island
Thousand Islands
Three Sisters Islands
Unity Island (formerly known as Squaw Island)
U Thant Island (Belmont Island)
Valcour Island
Wards Island

Pennsylvania
Bald Eagle Island
Barbadoes Island
Bayshore Island
Big Chestnut Island
Brunner Island
Brunot Island
Brushy Island
City Island
Cogley Island
Davis Island
Deep Water Island
Duncan Island
Eagle Island
Else Island
Ely Island
Getter's Island
Green Island
Haldeman Island
Hendrick Island
Hennery Island
Georgetown Island
Herr's Island
Hill Island
Jacks Island
Little Chestnut Island
Little Tinicum Island
Lower Bear Island
Mt. Johnson Island
Murphy Island
Nancy's Island
Neville Island
Nicholson Island
Ninemile Island
Phillis Island
Piney Island
Rookery Island
Ross Island
Sassafras Island
Shad Island
Shelley Island
Sicily Island
Sixmile Island
Sycamore Island
Three Mile Island
Tinicum Island
Turkey Island
Twelvemile Island
Upper Bear Island
Urey Island
Wildcat Island
Wolf Island

Rhode Island
Albro Island
Aquidneck Island
Barker Island
Beach Island
Beef Island
Bill Island
Bills Island
Block Island
Browning Isles - historical
Bush Island
Castle Island
Cedar Island - Lat. - 41.377'N/Lon. - 71.613'W, Kingston, Washington County
Cedar Island - Lat. - 41.404'N/Lon. - 71.503'W, Kingston, Washington County
Chepiwanoxet Island - historical
Coaster's Harbor Island
Conanicut Island
Cornelius Island
Crab Island
Cranberry Island
Cummock Island
Despair Island
Dutch Island
Dyer Island
East Island
Flower Island
Fort Island
Fox Island
Gardner Island - Lat. - 41.380'N/Lon. - 71.539'W, Kingston, Washington County
Gardner Island - Lat. - 41.406'N/Lon. - 71.508'W, Kingston, Washington County
Gingerbread Island
Goat Island
Goose Island - Kingston, Washington County
Goose Island - Narragansett Pier, Washington County
Gooseberry Island - Newport, Newport County
Gooseberry Island - Prudence Island, Newport County
Gooseberry Island - Narragansett Pier, Washington County
Gooseberry Island - Lat. - 41.373'N/Lon. - 71.618'W, Kingston, Washington County
Gooseberry Island - Lat. - 41.385'N/Lon. - 71.517'W, Kingston, Washington County
Gould Island - Prudence Island, Newport County
Gould Island - Tiverton, Newport County
Governors Island
Great Island
Greene Island
Harbour Island
Hazard Island
Heather Island
Hen Island
Hog Hill Island
Hog Island
Hope Island
Horace Island
The Hummocks
Jacks Island
Jacob Island
Jonathan Island
Kedinker Island
Lime Rock
Little Comfort Island
Little Cormorant Rock
Little Island - Bristol, Bristol County
Little Island - East Providence, Bristol County
Marsh Island
Oak Island
Page Island
Pancake Island
Patience Island
Phillips Island
Pine Island
Plato Island
Pomham Rocks Island
Potato Island
Prudence Island
Rabbit Island
Ram Island - Kingston, Washington County
Ram Island - Narragansett Pier, Washington County
Rat Island
Rhode Island
Rock Island - East Greenwich, Kent County
Rock Island - Providence, Providence County
Rose Island
Rye Island
Sagebed Island
Sandy Point Island
Sassafras Island
Sauks Island - Lat. - 41.371'N/Lon. - 71.646'W, Quonochontaug, Washington County
Sauks Island - Lat. - 41.369'N/Lon. 71.651'W, Quonochontaug, Washington County
Seal Island
Sedge Beds
Shell Island
Skippers Island
Snake Island
Spar Island
Spectacle Island
Star Island
Starve Goat Island - historical
Stevens Island
Sunshine Island - historical
Tommy Island
Twin Islands
Walker Island
Ward Island
West Island
Whale Rock

Vermont
Ball Island
Beartrap Island
Bell Island
Bixby Island
Black Island
Bond Island
Burton Island
Butler Island
Button Island
Carleton Prize
Cave Island
Cedar Island - Chittenden County
Cedar Island - Grand Isle County
Cloak Island
Coates Island
Cove Island
Dameas Island
Dean Island
Derway Island
Diamond Island
Fish Bladder Island
Fox Island
Garden Island
Gardiner Island
Gleason Island
Grand Isle
Gull Island
Gull Rock
Halls Island
Hemlock Island
Hen Island
Hog Island
Hollands Pasture Island
Horseneck Island
Huntley Island
Isle La Motte
Juniper Island
Kellogg Island
Knight Island
Lapham Island
Law Island
Lazy Lady Island
Long Point Island
Marble Island
Mason Island
Meach Island
Metcalfe Island
Isla la Motte
Mud Island
Mudgett Island
Neshobe Island
Noaks Island
North Hero Island
Picket Island
Pine Island - Chittenden County
Pine Island - Grand Isle County
Popasquash Island
Providence Island
Province Island
Queneska Island
Rabbit Island
Rock Island - Addison County
Rock Island - Franklin County
Savage Island
Sawyer Island
Shad Island
Ship Point
Sister Islands
Sloop Island
South Hero Island
Stave Island
Streeter Island
Sunken Island
Sunset Island
Tara Island
Woods Island
Young Island

See also
List of islands of the United States

Northeast US
Islands
Islands
Islands
Islands
Islands
Islands
Islands
Atlantic Ocean-related lists